are ancient reports on provincial culture, geography, and oral tradition presented to the reigning monarchs of Japan, also known as local gazetteers. They contain agricultural, geographical, and historical records as well as mythology and folklore. Fudoki manuscripts also document local myths, rituals, and poems that are not mentioned in the Kojiki and the Nihon Shoki chronicles, which are the most important literature of the ancient national mythology and history. In the course of national unification, the imperial court enacted a series of criminal and administrative codes called ritsuryō and surveyed the provinces established by such codes to exert greater control over them.

Kofudoki 

In the narrower sense, Fudoki refer to the oldest records written in the Nara period, later called  (Old-Fudoki). Compilation of Kofudoki began in 713 and was completed over a 20-year period. Following the Taika Reform in 646 and the Code of Taihō enacted in 701, there was need to centralize and solidify the power of the imperial court. This included accounting for lands under its control. According to the Shoku Nihongi, Empress Genmei issued a decree in 713 ordering each  to collect and report the following information:
Names of districts and townships
Natural resources and living things
Land fertility
Etymology of names for geographic features, such as mountains, plains, and rivers 
Myths, legends, and folktales told orally by old people

Names

Empress Genmei ordered in 713 that place names in the provinces, districts, and townships be written in two kanji characters with positive connotations. This occasionally required name changes. For example,  became  and  became .

Manuscripts

At least 48 of the Gokishichidō provinces contributed to their records but only that of Izumo remains nearly complete. Partial records of Hizen, Bungo, Harima and Hitachi remain and a few passages from various volumes remain scattered throughout various books. Those of Harima and Hizen are designated National Treasures.

Below is a list of extant manuscripts and scattered passages.

Kinai
Yamashiro Province: Yamashiro no Kuni Fudoki 山城国風土記
Yamato Province: Yamato no Kuni Fudoki 大和国風土記
Settsu Province: Settsu no Kuni Fudoki 摂津国風土記

Tōkaidō
Iga Province: Iga no Kuni Fudoki 伊賀国風土記
Ise Province: Ise no Kuni Fudoki 伊勢国風土記
Shima Province: Shima no Kuni Fudoki 志摩国風土記
Owari Province: Owari no Kuni Fudoki 尾張国風土記
Mikawa Province: Mikawa no Kuni Fudoki 参河(三河)国風土記
Suruga Province: Suruga no Kuni Fudoki :ja:駿河国風土記
Izu Province: Izu no Kuni Fudoki 伊豆国風土記
Kai Province: Kai no Kuni Fudoki 甲斐国風土記
Sagami Province: Sagami no Kuni Fudoki 相模国風土記
Shimōsa Province: Shimousa no Kuni Fudoki 下総国風土記
Kazusa Province: Kazusa no Kuni Fudoki 上総国風土記
Hitachi Province: Hitachi no Kuni Fudoki :ja:常陸国風土記

Tōsandō
Ōmi Province: Ōmi no Kuni Fudoki :ja:近江国風土記
Mino Province: Mino no Kuni Fudoki 美濃国風土記
Hida Province: Hida no Kuni Fudoki 飛騨国風土記
Shinano Province: Shinano no Kuni Fudoki 信濃国風土記
Michinoku Province: Michinoku no Kuni Fudoki 陸奥国風土記

Hokurikudō
Wakasa Province: Wakasa no Kuni Fudoki 若狭国風土記
Echizen Province: Echizen no Kuni Fudoki 越前国風土記
Echigo Province: Echigo no Kuni Fudoki 越後国風土記

San'indō
Tango Province: Tango no Kuni Fudoki :ja:丹後国風土記
Inaba Province: Inaba no Kuni Fudoki 因幡国風土記
Hōki Province: Hōki no Kuni Fudoki 伯耆国風土記
Izumo Province: Izumo no Kuni Fudoki :ja:出雲国風土記
Iwami Province: Iwami no Kuni Fudoki 石見国風土記

San'yōdō
Harima Province: Harima no Kuni Fudoki :ja:播磨国風土記
Mimasaka Province: Mimasaka no Kuni Fudoki 美作国風土記
Bizen Province: Bizen no Kuni Fudoki 備前国風土記
Bitchū Province: Bitchū no Kuni Fudoki 備中国風土記
Bingo Province: Bingo no Kuni Fudoki :ja:備後国風土記

Nankaidō
Kii Province: Kii no Kuni Fudoki 紀伊国風土記
Awaji Province: Awaji no Kuni Fudoki 淡路国風土記
Awa Province (Tokushima): Awa no Kuni Fudoki 阿波国風土記
Sanuki Province: Sanuki no Kuni Fudoki 讃岐国風土記
Iyo Province: Iyo no Kuni Fudoki 伊予国風土記
Tosa Province: Tosa no Kuni Fudoki 土佐国風土記

Saikaidō
Chikuzen Province: Chikuzen no Kuni Fudoki 筑前国風土記
Chikugo Province: Chikugo no Kuni Fudoki 筑後国風土記
Buzen Province: Buzen no Kuni Fudoki 豊前国風土記
Bungo Province: Bungo no Kuni Fudoki :ja:豊後国風土記
Hizen Province: Hizen no Kuni Fudoki :ja:肥前国風土記
Higo Province: Higo no Kuni Fudoki 肥後国風土記
Hyūga Province: Hyūga no Kuni Fudoki 日向国風土記
Ōsumi Province: Ōsumi no Kuni Fudoki 大隅国風土記
Satsuma Province: Satsuma no Kuni Fudoki 薩摩国風土記
Iki Province: Iki no Kuni Fudoki 壱岐国風土記

Parks

In 1966 the Agency for Cultural Affairs called on the prefectural governments to build open-air museums and parks called  near historic sites such as tombs (kofun) and provincial temples. These archaeological museums preserve and exhibit cultural properties to enhance public understanding of provincial history and culture.

See also
Japanese Historical Text Initiative

Notes

References

External links
 風土記(Big5 Chinese) texts of the remaining Fudoki & scattered passages in other books.
Manuscript scans at Waseda University Library: Hizen, 1800,Bungo, 1800, Bungo, unknown
 
風土記 
国土としての始原史～風土記逸文 

Classical Japan
Old Japanese texts
Nara-period works
Agriculture in Japan
Japanese mythology
Shinto texts